The 1946 Boston College Eagles football team was an American football team that represented Boston College as an independent during the 1946 college football season. The Eagles were led by third-year head coach Denny Myers, who returned to coach the team after serving in the United States Navy during the previous three seasons. The team compiled a 6–3 record and outcored opponents by a total of 235 to 123.

The Eagles ranked ninth nationally in total offense with an average of 351.0 yards per game. They also ranked third nationally in passing offense (140.7 passing yards per game), 11th nationally in total defense (giving up 176.8 yards per game), 15th nationally in scoring offense (26.0 points per game).

The team played it home games at Braves Field in Boston, Massachusetts.

Schedule

After the season

The 1947 NFL Draft was held on December 16, 1946. The following Eagles were selected.

References

Boston College
Boston College Eagles football seasons
Boston College Eagles football
1940s in Boston